Parachute is a 2023 film that marks the directorial debut of Brittany Snow. Snow also co-wrote the script with Becca Gleason. It was produced by Yale Entertainment. It stars Courtney Eaton and Thomas Mann. It had its world premiere at the SXSW Film Festival in March 2023.

Synopsis
Riley is an unemployed 20-something just out of rehab with an eating disorder when she meets the amiable Ethan (Thomas Mann).

Cast
Courtney Eaton as Riley
Thomas Mann as Ethan
Scott Mescudi as Justin
Francesca Reale as Casey
Gina Rodriguez as Dr Akerman
Joel McHale as Jamie
Kathryn Gallagher as Gwen
Owen Thiele as Devon
Ekaterina Baker as Danielle
Dave Bautista as Bryce
Mlé Chester as Janice
Chrissie Fit as Denise
Lukas Gage as Dalton
Kelley Jakle as Katie
Jeremy Kucharek as Max

Production
The project was announced as “September 17th” in February 2022 for Yale Productions with Jordan Yale Levine and Jordan Beckerman producing along with Lizzie Shapiro. Brittany Snow directed and produced the picture, and co-wrote the script with Becca Gleason. Snow said she had the idea for the film in her “early twenties”. Snow has spoken previously about her own battle
with eating disorders and rigorously planned with storyboards “darker” scenes so as to avoid Eaton spending more time than necessary in scenes criticising her own body, saying “I knew what I wanted very specifically in those scenes, I knew what angles I wanted to use, so I didn’t have to have her cry hysterically all day.“ The film was scored by Keegan DeWitt.

Casting
In March 2022 Kid Cudi was announced to be cast in the project. In June 2022 Eaton, Mann, Rodríguez and McHale were confirmed as in the cast.

Release
The film had its premiere at the SXSW Film Festival in Austin, Texas on March 11, 2023.

Reception
Nate Richard in Collider described it as “a breath of fresh air. This is a film that's more focused on its characters rather than trying to preach a message to its audience [and] invites viewers to take a walk in someone else's shoes.”

References

External links

2020s English-language films
2020s American films 2023 films
Upcoming directorial debut films